Asrama Haji Station is a station of the Palembang LRT Line 1. The station began operations on 7 September 2018, after the 2018 Asian Games had concluded.

Nearby the station is Palembang Hajj Dormitory (Asrama Haji Palembang), hence its name.

Station layout

References

Palembang
Railway stations in South Sumatra
Railway stations opened in 2018